The original Ferris Wheel, sometimes also referred to as the Chicago Wheel, was designed and built by George Washington Gale Ferris Jr. as the centerpiece of the Midway at the 1893 World's Columbian Exposition in Chicago, Illinois.
Since its construction, many other Ferris wheels have been constructed that were patterned after it.

The Ferris Wheel was dismantled then rebuilt in Lincoln Park, Chicago, in 1895, and dismantled and rebuilt a third and final time for the 1904 World's Fair in St. Louis, Missouri, where it was ultimately demolished in 1906. In 2007, the 45 foot, 70-ton axle was discovered buried near where it was demolished.

Design and construction
The Ferris Wheel was designed and constructed by George Washington Gale Ferris Jr., a graduate of Rensselaer Polytechnic Institute. He was a Pittsburgh, Pennsylvania bridge-builder. He began his career in the railroad industry and then pursued an interest in bridge building. Ferris understood the growing need for structural steel and founded G.W.G. Ferris & Co. in Pittsburgh, a firm that tested and inspected metals for railroads and bridge builders.

Dynamite was used to break through three feet of frozen ground, to create a foundation for the wheel, during the construction of the wheel in Jackson Park during the winter of 1892–93.  Jets of steam were used by workers to thaw dirt and prevent poured concrete from freezing.  Piles of timber were driven thirty-two feet into the ground, on top of which was laid a grillage of steel, filled with concrete.

The wheel rotated on a 71-ton, 45.5 foot (13.9 meters) long axle comprising what was at that time the world's largest hollow forging, manufactured in Pittsburgh by the Bethlehem Iron Company and weighing , together with two  cast-iron spiders weighing . A miniature wooden replica resides in Pittsburgh at the Senator John Heinz History Center.

There were 36 passenger cars, each fitted with 40 revolving chairs and able to accommodate up to 60 people, giving a total capacity of 2,160.

On June 9, 1893, the wheel was primed for a test run with great anticipation and a good deal of anxiety. The engine that would activate the wheel was fueled by steam boilers whose underground mains rushed steam to propel the pistons of its thousand-horsepower engines. Upon first seeing the wheel which towered over everything in its vicinity, Julian Hawthorne, son of the author Nathaniel, was amazed that anything of such a size "continues to keep itself erect ... it has no visible means of support – none that appear adequate. The spokes look like cobwebs; they are after the fashion of those on the newest make of bicycles".

Both Ferris and his associate W. F. Gronau also recognized the engineering marvel the wheel represented, as a giant wheel that would turn slowly and smoothly without structural failure had never before been attempted.

For its inaugural run, no cars had yet been attached. The workmen however, climbed the structure and settled themselves on the spokes to the accompaniment of cheers from an audience of fair employees who had gathered to watch the momentous event.  After the wheel had completed its first rotation, Gronau deemed the test a success. "I could have yelled out loud for joy".

Ferris himself had not been able to attend the launching of his invention, and that evening received a telegram: "The last coupling and final adjustment was made and steam turned on at six o’clock this evening one complete revolution of the big wheel was made everything working satisfactory twenty minutes time was taken for the revolution – I congratulate you upon its complete success midway is wildly enthusiastic".

Operation
The Ferris Wheel took 20 minutes to make two revolutions, the first involving six stops to allow passengers to exit and enter and the second a nine-minute non-stop rotation, for which the ticket holder paid 50 cents.

The Ferris Wheel first opened to the public as the centerpiece of the World's Columbian Exposition at Midway Plaisance in Chicago on June 21, 1893, and continued to operate there until after the exposition ended in October 1893.

After the Columbian Exposition

The wheel itself closed in April 1894 and was then dismantled and stored until the following year, when it was rebuilt in the Lincoln Park, Chicago, neighborhood. The amusement park was located at 2619 to 2665 N. Clark, which is now the location of a McDonald's and a high-rise residential building. The original plan was to include a beer garden and vaudeville show, but the liquor license was not granted. William D. Boyce, then a local resident, filed a Circuit Court action against the owners of the wheel to have it removed, but without success.

In 1896, the Lumiere Brothers, inventors of cinema, shot film (catalogue number 338) of the intersection of Wrightwood and Clark which included the Ferris wheel. It is one of the first films of Chicago.

The wheel operated at Clark St. from October 1895 until 1903, when it was purchased at auction by the Chicago House Wrecking Company (CHWC) for $8,150.

It was then dismantled for a second time and transported by rail to St. Louis for the 1904 World's Fair, where it earned the CHWC about $215,000.

Demolition and disposition
After the 1904 World's Fair closed on December 1, 1904, no purchasers were found who would pay for the relocation of the great Ferris Wheel, despite many efforts. It was finally destroyed by controlled demolition using dynamite on May 11, 1906 (18 months after the fair closed), to be sold for scrap. This was necessary because the contract with the city of St. Louis required the "restoration of Forest Park."

It has not yet been excavated.

Since 2000, other published documents and research into original papers (from the Chicago House Wrecking Company, c.1904-1906) indicate that the axle was taken back to Chicago, where it was eventually cut up for scrap when oxy-acetylene torches improved sufficiently to cut the hardened steel axle up for scrap. These references include Norman Anderson's book Ferris Wheels: An Illustrated History, several unpublished CHWC letters and documents, an article by Leo Harris (grandson of the CHWC's Treasurer) who wrote that "...the giant axle of the wheel was returned to the yards of the CHWC, where it remained until it was cut up for its steel content at the beginning of World War I", and an article published on February 1, 1907, in the Clinton (IL) Register, indicating, "The last of the Ferris Wheel has been taken away... It was found necessary to blow off the flanges from the axle ... before it could be loaded on a (railroad) car".

Coordinates
 1893–1894 – Midway Plaisance, Chicago:  
 1895–1903 – Lincoln Park, Chicago: 
 1904–1906 – St. Louis:

In popular culture
 The hero of Robert Lawson's children's book The Great Wheel is part of the construction crew for the original Chicago Ferris Wheel.
The characters of the film Meet Me in St. Louis, attending the 1904 World's Fair, observe the Ferris Wheel and foreshadow its eventual demolition.

References

Former Ferris wheels
Ferris wheels in the United States
World's Columbian Exposition
Louisiana Purchase Exposition
Demolished buildings and structures in Chicago
Buildings and structures demolished in 1906
Articles containing video clips
1893 establishments in Illinois
Buildings and structures completed in 1893